José Antonio Letelier Henríquez (born 23 May 1966) is a Chilean football coach and former professional goalkeeper. He has been head coach of the Chile women's national football team since 2015.

Playing career
Letelier started playing in the youth categories of Universidad de Chile, before switching to rivals Colo-Colo where he was taken on as a professional in 1987. In 1988 Colo-Colo sent Letelier and three other young players – Francisco Huerta,Parcko Quiroz and René Pinto – on loan to Alianza Lima, whose team had perished in the 1987 Alianza Lima plane crash. After a further loan at Deportes Valdivia, he returned to Colo-Colo and understudied Daniel Morón and Marcelo Ramírez in the club's 1991 Copa Libertadores-winning squad.

He was signed by Mexican club Atlético Morelia, where he played in 1991 and 1992, coinciding with his compatriot Juan Gutiérrez. He then completed his career back in Chile, with stints at Huachipato and Deportes Linares.

Coaching career
After retiring as a player, Letelier trained as a PE teacher and obtained his coaching licences from the Instituto Nacional del Fútbol (INAF). He began coaching goalkeepers in Colo-Colo's boys' teams, then took charge of the club's women's section in 2010. He won the Chilean women's football championship ten times in succession, the last nine under the Apertura and Clausura format. When Colo-Colo won the 2012 Copa Libertadores Femenina, Letelier became the first individual to be part of winning squads in both the male and female Libertadores tournaments.

In June 2015 he was appointed technical director of the Chile women's national football team, with his first task to prepare an under 20 team for the 2015 South American U-20 Women's Championship. When the senior women's national team played their first fixture in three years in May 2017, they thrashed hapless Peru 12–0. At the 2018 Copa América Femenina, Letelier steered hosts Chile to a runners-up finish, securing qualification to their first ever FIFA Women's World Cup in 2019.

References

External links

1966 births
Living people
Footballers from Santiago
Chilean footballers
Colo-Colo footballers
Club Alianza Lima footballers
Deportes Valdivia footballers
Atlético Morelia players
C.D. Huachipato footballers
Deportes Linares footballers
Association football goalkeepers
Chilean Primera División players
Peruvian Primera División players
Liga MX players
Primera B de Chile players
Chilean expatriate footballers
Expatriate footballers in Peru
Chilean expatriate sportspeople in Peru
Expatriate footballers in Mexico
Chilean expatriate sportspeople in Mexico
Chilean football managers
2019 FIFA Women's World Cup managers
Chile women's national football team managers